Coffee, Tea or Me? is a book of purported memoirs by the fictitious stewardesses Trudy Baker and Rachel Jones, written by the initially uncredited Donald Bain and first published in 1967. The book depicts the anecdotal lives of two lusty young stewardesses, and was originally presented as factual.

Publishing history
Donald Bain revealed in his 2002 memoir Every Midget Has an Uncle Sam Costume: Writing for a Living that he wrote Coffee, Tea or Me? and three sequels while employed as a New York City–based American Airlines public relations person. The publisher hired two Eastern Airlines stewardesses to pose as the authors for book tours and television appearances. As The New York Times columnist Joe Sharkey described in 2010,

Bain himself said, "I wrote it in 1966 while working in public relations for American Airlines, and it went on to spawn an entire genre of wacky comedies, including three direct sequels. All in all, the four books sold more than five million copies worldwide, and became my annuity for almost 17 years."

The first edition hardcover was published in October 1967 by Bartholomew House, an imprint of Bartell Media Corporation, with a second printing in December, and a third in January 1968. Bantam Books, at that time a subsidiary of Grosset & Dunlap, released a paperback edition in November 1968, and had reached its tenth printing by January 1969. Bain was uncredited other than in a dedication, until the 2003 edition, in which he was credited beneath the Baker and Jones byline as "with Donald Bain."

The Penguin Group, the publisher as of the 21st century, describes the book as "adult fiction".

Style and content
Written in the first person voice of Trudy Baker, with Bain's name appearing as a dedication between the index of chapters and the foreword, the book describes a kind of glamorous lifestyle from the stewardess' point of view, working for two years for an unnamed American carrier out of a New York crewbase during the golden age of airline travel.

It is written to emphasize the sexy parts of the job, although difficult experiences are also recounted, and reflects the shifts in society and culture then underway.  It also contains content that could in later decades be deemed sexist, and dated descriptions of homosexuality; chapter X is titled "They Looked So Normal".  In chapter XIV, the attendants list one of the types of passengers that could be denied boarding rights—"most recently, men wearing earrings." Illustrations by men's-magazine cartoonist Bill Wenzel depict the flight attendants and female passengers as busty sexpots.

The book contains period references to television shows such as Batman and lists of celebrities the authors claim to have carried on their flights, as well as an incidental description of the airline introducing Boeing 727 service. Other equipment mentioned includes the Boeing 707 and the smaller BAC 111. People's names are fictitious, excepting the famous, and there is no way to gauge the accuracy of any of the accounts.

Sequels and spinoffs
Capitalizing on the success of the publication, Bain wrote three sequels: The Coffee Tea or Me Girls' Round-the-World Diary (1969), The Coffee, Tea or Me Girls Lay It on the Line (1972) and The Coffee, Tea or Me Girls Get Away from It All (1974). A TV film of the same title, loosely based on Coffee, Tea or Me? was made in 1973.

The Jaggerz' #2 hit "The Rapper" from 1970 contains the line "Come up to my place for some coffee, or tea, or me." The phrase is also mentioned in the 1978 Skyhooks song "Women in Uniform" and the 1988 film Working Girl.

The book's title lent itself to a 2002 documentary of the same name, with the subtitle The Surprising Story of the Underestimated Trolley Dolly, which interviewed air hostesses who worked in the New Zealand airline industry in the 1960s and 1970s.

See also
 Boeing-Boeing, 1962 play
 Boeing Boeing, 1965 film version of the play
 Come Fly with Me, 1963 film
 The Stewardesses, 1969 film

References

1967 American novels
Aviation novels
Literary forgeries
Works about flight attendants